The aluminium price-fixing conspiracy was a confirmed effort by Goldman Sachs Group Inc, JPMorgan Chase & Co, Glencore Xstrata and their warehouse companies to inflate the price of aluminium by creating artificial supply shortages at their warehouses between 2010 and 2013. On July 20, 2013, The New York Times published an article outlining the scheme which subsequently brought about the attention of the United States Justice Department. The New York Times went on to estimate that the actions of the accused cost American consumers almost $5 billion during its duration.

See also 
Lysine price-fixing conspiracy

References 

Corporate scandals
Goldman Sachs
JPMorgan Chase
Aluminium
2013 scandals